Ivan Vyskočil (born 21 May 1946 in Prague) is a Czech actor. He starred in the film Poslední propadne peklu under director Ludvík Ráža in 1982.

Selected filmography
 The Tailor from Ulm (1978)
 The Young Man and Moby Dick (1979)
 Poslední propadne peklu (1982)
 Smrt krásných srnců (1986)

References

1946 births
Living people
Czech male television actors
Czech male film actors
Czech male stage actors
Male actors from Prague
20th-century Czech male actors
21st-century Czech male actors
Academy of Performing Arts in Prague alumni
Recipients of the Thalia Award